Kalkoonthal  is a village in Idukki district in the Indian state of Kerala.

Demographics
 India census, Kalkoonthal had a population of 41103 with 20776 males and 20327 females.

References

Villages in Idukki district